Survarium was a free-to-play online first-person shooter with role-playing and survival elements developed by Vostok Games through a venture capital following the purported cancellation of S.T.A.L.K.E.R. 2 and closure of GSC Game World in December 2011. Although Survarium is external to the S.T.A.L.K.E.R. series, the developers intend to include comparable features, notably the anomalies and artifacts that reference the Russian science-fiction novel Roadside Picnic, and the 'ecological catastrophe' that renders much of the environment uninhabitable for humans.

Gameplay 

At this point in development and for the foreseeable future, Survarium is not a massively multiplayer online first-person shooter (MMOFPS), despite Vostok Games listing it as such on the game's website. According to Vostok Games their "ultimate goal is to eventually combine the entire world of Survarium into one massive game world," but no mention has been made of increasing the number of players allowed to interact simultaneously in the game world to achieve the status of being a true MMOFPS.

Planned game modes
Vostok Games have detailed their plans for Survarium in Dev Diaries both in written and video form. There are three planned game modes announced so far.

Team play (PvP)
The PvP mode is intended to allow players to represent their chosen factions and combat against rival factions. There are currently five modes available: Team Deathmatch, Artifact Hunt, Research, Battery Retrieval, and Slaughter. The latter was added in Survarium update 0.30.

Free play
The free play game mode will contain a large, session based map with limited numbers of players in it at one time. Players will enter the map at a random point and can freely explore the map to scavenge supplies and uncover components of the story. Players can choose to work together with other players, fight against them or avoid them altogether. Players will be able to leave the map with all earned items by getting to one of the exit points located around each map.

If a player is killed, they lose all items found during that session and are moved back to the lobby where they can enter another free play instance.

Co-op
The cooperative game mode is intended to contain the main story arc of Survarium. Squads of players will enter a random map and work together to discover the cause of the apocalypse and a possible defense against its spread.

Plot
A worldwide ecological disaster occurred in the year 2020, wiping out approximately 90% of the human race. The disaster takes the form of a fast-growing forest, that actively seeks out threats to its growth and destroys them. Such targets include weapons manufacturers, military installations and laboratories that are working on methods of stopping the spread of the forest. No manmade efforts to stop the forest worked, with only natural barriers being able to slow it down.

Survarium takes place in 2026 with players attempting to survive and defend themselves against the forest in destroyed cities and encampments. Players can choose to join a faction to gain access to supplies and resources. There are currently four factions, although Vostok Games has stated that they intend to have nine factions upon completion, however not all will be playable as some are intended to add support to the story as players progress. The factions all follow different ideals and often conflict with that of other factions, creating hostilities.

The cause of the disaster is not known, stated to be discovered by players as they progress through the game. The story itself is intended to be shaped by choices made by players while representing their chosen factions.

History

On 9 December 2011, video game journalists reported that Sergei Grigorovich, the chief executive officer (CEO) of GSC Game World, had allegedly expressed his disappointment at the development of S.T.A.L.K.E.R. 2 during a meeting with employees. Despite the company's initial denials in response to press inquiries, the media widely reported that senior management had officially cancelled S.T.A.L.K.E.R. 2 and dissolved the company. In March 2012, former employees from GSC Game World founded Vostok Games with capital from Vostok Ventures Ltd, and announced subsequently the development of Survarium on 25 April 2012.

On 13 May 2013, the alpha test started in Russian and Ukrainian-speaking territories. The alpha launched internationally a few weeks later. The closed beta testing for the PvP mode began on 20 December 2013 although it did not have even have 50% of the planned content implemented at the time. Survarium went into open beta on 5 January 2015.

The soundtrack and effects in Survarium were made by the founder of the Ukrainian melodic death metal band Firelake.

Shut down
On May 31 2022, 23:59 Kiev time, the servers had shut down with a letter of grievance from the development team. One of the following reasons being that Vostok Games is located in Ukraine and according to the development team they're "Safe but not in a position to work on further updates."

References

External links

Vostok Games official website

2015 video games
Delisted digital-only games
First-person shooters
Post-apocalyptic video games
Video games developed in Ukraine
Windows games
Windows-only games
Early access video games
Video games set in Ukraine
Multiplayer online games